Denis Tuohy (born 2 April 1937) is an Irish television broadcaster, newsreader, journalist, and actor.

Tuohy was born 2 April 1937 in Belfast, Northern Ireland. He attended Queen's University, Belfast, where he learned to debate and acquired an interest in acting. In 1960, he appeared in Over the Bridge, a play written by Sam Thompson and directed by Jimmy Ellis. Later that year, Tuohy became the first Catholic broadcaster for BBC Northern Ireland.

Tuohy moved to London in 1964 to work for the new BBC2. At the channel's launch that April, he was scheduled to be the first face on air. However, there was a power failure on the opening night, and newsreader Gerald Priestland was briefly seen before transmission was aborted and the official launch postponed until the day after. The opening broadcast began with a shot of a burning candle and Tuohy then blowing it out.

Tuohy participated in several of the BBC's current affairs programmes of the 1970s, including Tonight and
the long-running Panorama, and, after moving to Thames Television, he was a reporter and presenter for This Week (and TV Eye, 1978–1986). He interviewed Margaret Thatcher in the leadup to the 1979 United Kingdom general election. Communication specialist Geoffrey Beattie analysed the interview extensively in a work on patterns of interruption in conversation.  During the 1990s, he was a newscaster for ITN, usually anchoring overnight bulletins and the ITV Morning News, and also worked on several documentaries.

On returning to live in Ireland in 2001 Tuohy took up acting again, playing roles in RTE's Fair City, The Clinic, and Fallout. and BBC NI's "Betrayal of Trust."  He also wrote a memoir, Wide-Eyed in Medialand: A Broadcaster's Journey. As a broadcaster he has written and presented over twenty documentaries for UTV particularly The Troubles I've Seen. He has made many contributions to BBC Radio Ulster's Thought for the Day. A collection of them, Streets and Secret Places, was published in 2021.

References

Notes

External links

1937 births
Living people
BBC newsreaders and journalists
ITN newsreaders and journalists
Mass media people from Belfast
20th-century male actors from Northern Ireland
21st-century male actors from Northern Ireland